Alfonso Lovo Cordero (June 11, 1927  – May 10, 2018) was a politician from Nicaragua. He was the most forward thinking Minister of Agriculture in the history of Nicaragua. Under the Presidency of Anastasio Somoza Debayle, he succeeded in gaining for Nicaragua the title of “Granary of Central America“. He was born in Ocotal, Nueva Segovia. After Anastasio Somoza Debayle finished his term, while Nicaragua underwent a process of Constitutional reform he was elected by the Constitutional Assembly to serve in the Liberal-Conservative Junta from May 1, 1972, until December 1, 1974. He died in Miami, Florida on May 10, 2018, at the age of 90.

References

1927 births
2018 deaths
Presidents of Nicaragua
People from El Paraíso Department